Idle Roomers is a 1931 American comedy film directed by Fatty Arbuckle, starring Frank Molino and Alfred Molino.

See also
 Fatty Arbuckle filmography

External links

1931 films
1931 comedy films
1931 short films
Films directed by Roscoe Arbuckle
Educational Pictures short films
American black-and-white films
American comedy short films
Films with screenplays by Jack Townley
1930s English-language films
1930s American films
English-language comedy films